The Railway College is a railway academy in Ulaanbaatar, Mongolia. It was established in 1953.

Notable alumni
 Sergelen Otgonbaatar, basketball player

References

Educational organizations based in Mongolia